Nathan Jones may refer to:

People 
Nathan Jones (Australian footballer) (born 1988), Australian rules footballer
Nathan Jones (wrestler) (born 1969), Australian wrestler and actor
Nathan Jones (Welsh footballer) (born 1973), Welsh football manager and former player
Nathan Leigh Jones (born 1981), Australian pop singer, songwriter and pianist

Other uses 
"Nathan Jones" (song), a 1971 single by The Supremes, covered in 1988 by Bananarama

See also 
Nate Jones (disambiguation)
Nathaniel Jones (disambiguation)

Jones, Nathan